Maurice Kelly (2 October 1924 – 26 November 1989) was a Bahamian sailor. He competed in the Dragon event at the 1960 Summer Olympics.

References

External links
 

1924 births
1989 deaths
Bahamian male sailors (sport)
Olympic sailors of the Bahamas
Sailors at the 1960 Summer Olympics – Dragon
Sportspeople from Nassau, Bahamas